Wisenheimer is the third studio album by the Australian band Custard. It was released in November 1995 and peaked at number 55 in September 1996. The album contains the song "Apartment" which reached #7 in the third Hottest 100.

Recording
Frontman Dave McCormack later said, "To have the opportunity to go to San Francisco and record with Eric Drew Feldman in Hyde St Studios – where Creedence had recorded and Green Day were recording – that was massive. We were there for months. It was very premium, professional, proper band stuff. We landed on the 4th of July, 1995 and went straight to the supermarket. You could buy booze at the supermarket. It was a huge culture shock. The cheese was orange and the butter was white."

Reception
Rolling Stone Australia said, "Songs like 'Apartment' and 'Sunset Strip' have been fashioned with melody, imagination and undeniable craft and Eric Drew Feldman's production comes close to capturing the skill and energy of Custard live. Custard aren't about to stop making you smile, but that doesn't mean they're not serious."

Track listing

Charts

References

1995 albums
Custard (band) albums